2003 Dove Award Nominees for the thirty-fourth annual ceremony of the Dove Awards.

Nominees

Song of the Year
 "Above All"; Lenny LeBlanc, Paul Baloche; Integrity's Hosanna!Music, Len Songs Publishing (ASCAP)
 "Back in His Arms Again"; Mark Schultz; Mark Schultz Music (BMI)
 "Breathe"; Marie Barnett; Mercy/Vineyard Publishing (ASCAP)
 "Come Unto Me"; Nicole C. Mullen; Wordspring Music/Lil'Jas Music (SESAC)
 "Great Light of the World"; Bebo Norman; NewSpring Pub. Inc, Appstreet Music (ASCAP)
 "Here I Am To Worship"; Tim Hughes; Kingsway's Thankyou Music (PRS)
 "Holy"; Nichole Nordeman, Mark Hammond; Ariose Music, Mark Hammond Music (ASCAP)
 "Ocean Floor"; Mark Stuart, Bob Herdman, Tyler Burkum, Will McGinnis, Ben Cissell; Up in the Mix Music (ASCAP) (BMI)
 "Spoken For"; Bart Millard, Nathan Cochran, Mike Scheuchzer, Robby Shaffer, Jim Bryson, Peter Kipley; Simpleville, Wordspring Music, Songs from the Indigo Room (ASCAP) (SESAC)
 "Yes, I Believe"; Joel Lindsey, Tony Wood; Paragon Music/Vacation Boy Music/New Spring Publishing (ASCAP)
 "Youth of the Nation"; P.O.D. (Traa, Sonny, Marcos, Wuv) Paul Sandoval, Marco Curiel, Mark Traa, Noah Bernardo; Souljah Music/Famous Music Publishing (ASCAP)

Songwriter of the Year
 Bebo Norman
 Lenny LeBlanc
 Nichole Nordeman
 Paul Baloche
 Tim Hughes

Male Vocalist of the Year
 Bebo Norman
 Mac Powell
 Mark Schultz
 Michael W. Smith
 Steven Curtis Chapman

Female Vocalist of the Year
 Joy Williams
 Natalie Grant
 Nichole Nordeman
 Nicole C. Mullen
 Rebecca St. James

Group of the Year
 Audio Adrenaline
 MercyMe
 Selah
 Sixpence None the Richer
 Third Day

Artist of the Year
 MercyMe
 Michael W. Smith
 Steven Curtis Chapman
 Third Day
 tobyMac

New Artist of the Year
 Big Daddy Weave
 Daily Planet
 Jeff Deyo
 Paul Colman Trio
 Souljahz
 The Rock 'N' Roll Worship Circus

Producer of the Year
 Brown Bannister
 Charlie Peacock
 Monroe Jones
 Nathan Nockels
 Steve Hindalong

Rap/Hip Hop/Dance Recorded Song of the Year
 "All Around The World"; Fault Is History; Souljahz; Joshua Washington, Je'kob Washington & Rachael Washington, Chris Rodriquez; Warner Brothers
 "Amazing"; Exodus; Andy Hunter; Andy Hunter, Tedd T., Ray Goudie; Sparrow
 "Here We Go"; The Art Of Translation; GRITS; Teron Carter, Stacy Jones, Otto Price, Ric Robbins; Gotee
 "Irene"; Momentum; tobyMac; Toby McKeehan, Randall Crawford, Jeff Savage; ForeFront
 "J-Train"; Momentum; tobyMac with Kirk Franklin; Toby McKeehan, Jeff Savage, Randall Crawford; ForeFront

Modern Rock/Alternative Recorded Song of the Year
 "Blood Of Jesus"; Welcome to the Rock 'N' Roll Worship Circus; The Rock 'N' Roll Worship Circus; Gabriel Wilson, Blurr, Solo, Zurn, Mike Greeley, Mark Nelson, Terry Nelson; Vertical
 "Breathe Your Name"; Divine Discontent; Sixpence None the Richer; Matt Slocum; Reprise
 "Get This Party Started"; Momentum; tobyMac; Toby McKeehan, Pete Stewart, Michael-Anthony Taylor; ForeFront
 "Our Love Is Loud"; Can You Hear Us?; David Crowder Band; David Crowder; sixstepsrecords
 "Revolution"; The Eleventh Hour; Jars of Clay; Dan Haseltine, Charlie Lowell, Stephen Mason, Matt Odmark; Essential
 "Spin"; Stanley Climbfall; Lifehouse; Jason Wade, Ron Aniello; Sparrow

Hard Music Recorded Song of the Year
 "Boom"; Satellite; P.O.D.; P.O.D. (Traa, Sonny, Marcos, Wuv) Paul Sandoval, Marcos Curiel, Mark Traa, Noah Bernardo; Atlantic
 "Electric"; Out of My Mind; gs megaphone; Ben Shreve; Spindust
 "Fireproof"; Fireproof; Pillar; Rob Beckley, Michael Wittig, Brad Noone, Noah Henson; Flicker USA
 "Symbiotic"; Conceived in Fire; Living Sacrifice; Rocky Gray, Arthur Green, Bruce Fitzhugh, Matthew Putman, Lance Garvin; Solid State
 "Tonight"; Engage; PAX217; Josh Auer, Jesse Craig, Aaron Tosti, Dave Tosti, Joey Marchiano, Bobby Duran; ForeFront
 "Vapor"; Alien Youth; Skillet; John L. Cooper; Ardent

Rock Recorded Song of the Year
 "40 Days"; Come Together; Third Day; Mac Powell, Brad Avery, David Carr, Mark Lee, Tai Anderson; Essential
 "Broken"; 12 Stones; 12 Stones; Paul McCoy, Eric Weaver, Kevin Dorr, Aaron Gainer; Wind Up
 "Get On"; Come Together; Third Day; Mac Powell, Brad Avery, David Carr, Mark Lee, Tai Anderson; Essential
 "Speaking in Tongues"; Truth, Soul, Rock & Roll; The Elms; Owen Thomas; Sparrow
 "Tangled Web"; Hero; Daily Planet; Jesse Butterworth, Reggie Hamm; Reunion

Pop/Contemporary Recorded Song of the Year
 "Back in His Arms Again"; Song Cinema; Mark Schultz; Mark Schultz; Word
 "Great Light of the World"; Myself When I Am Real; Bebo Norman; Bebo Norman; Essential
 "Holy"; Woven & Spun; Nichole Nordeman; Nichole Nordeman, Mark Hammond; Sparrow
 "Love Someone Like Me"; Love Someone Like Me; Patty Cabrera; Patty Cabrera; Patrona Productions
 "Ocean Floor"; Lift; Audio Adrenaline; Mark Stuart, Will McGinniss, Bob Herdman, Tyler Burkum, Ben Cissell; ForeFront

Inspirational Recorded Song of the Year
 "Before It Was Said"; Have I Ever Told You; FFH; Michael Boggs, Jeromy Deibler, David Hamilton; Essential
 "Come Unto Me"; Talk About It; Nicole C. Mullen; Nicole C. Mullen; Word
 "Here I Am To Worship"; Here I Am To Worship; Tim Hughes; Tim Hughes; Worship Together
 "Purified"; Worship; Michael W. Smith; Michael W. Smith, Deborah D. Smith; Reunion
 "Who You Are"; Walk On; 4Him; Mark Harris, Chris Eaton; Word

Southern Gospel Recorded Song of the Year
 "Don't You Wanna Go?"; A Crabb Collection; The Crabb Family; Gerald Crabb; Family Music Group
 "I Rest My Case at the Cross"; Changed Forever; The Perrys; Kyla Rowland; Daywind
 "I Wanna Know How It Feels"; Triumph; Karen Peck and New River; John Darin Rowsey, Karen Peck Gooch; Spring Hill
 "I'm Gonna Sing"; Everything Good; Gaither Vocal Band; Gloria Gaither, Bill Gaither, Woody Wright; Spring House
 "More Than Ever"; I Do Believe; Gaither Vocal Band; Gloria Gaither, Bill Gaither, Woody Wright; Spring Hill

Bluegrass Recorded Song of the Year
 "I Sure Miss You"; A Crabb Collection; The Crabb Family; Gerald Crabb; Family Music Group
 "I've Come To Take You Home"; A Crabb Collection; The Crabb Family; Gerald Crabb; Family Music Group
 "Me and Jesus"; The Story Is...The Songs of Tom T. Hall; Charlie Sizemore, The Oak Ridge Boys; Tom T. Hall; Rebel
 "The Devil Can't Touch Your Soul"; Principles; Rick Hendrix; Hendrix Music
 "Walkin' and Talkin'"; 50th Anniversary; The Lewis Family; Wayne Haun, Joel Lindsey; Thoroughbred
 "You Must Be Born Again"; My, Oh My!; Jeff & Sheri Easter; Ulys Turner; Spring Hill

Country Recorded Song of the Year
 "God Is Good All The Time"; Blinded; Dave Moody; Paul Overstreet, Don Moen; Lamon
 "Leave Here Empty Handed"; Safe Thus Far; The Hoskins Family; Wayne Haun, Sue C. Smith; Daywind
 "Standing on the Promises"; Glorify Edify Testify; The Martins; Bill Baumgart, Dave Clark; Spring Hill
 "The Most Inconvenient Christmas"; An Inconvenient Christmas; The Oak Ridge Boys; Kyle Matthews; Spring Hill
 "The River's Gonna Keep On Rolling"; Legacy...Hymns & Faith; Amy Grant; Vince Gill; Word

Urban Recorded Song of the Year
 "Get Up"; Real; Israel; Paul Garcia, Israel Houghton, Tim Johnson; Integrity Gospel
 "Holla"; The Kiss; Trin-i-tee 5:7; James Moss, Paul Allen; Gospocentric/B-Rite
 "It's All About You"; I Need You Now; Smokie Norful; Smokie Norful, Antonio Dixon; EMI Gospel
 "Meditate"; This Is Your Life; Out of Eden; Lisa Kimmey, Michael Clemons, Nate Clemons, Eric Roberson; Gotee
 "Ordinary People"; Incredible; Mary Mary; Charlie Bereal, Kenny Bereal, Tina Atkins-Campbell, Erica Atkins-Campbell; Integrity

Traditional Gospel Recorded Song of the Year
 "Closet Religion"; Churchin' With Dottie; Dottie Peoples; Dottie Peoples; Atlanta International
 "Drug Me"; Walking By Faith; The Canton Spirituals; Harvey Watkins, JR.; Verity
 "Endow Me"; Twinkie Clark & Friends...Live in Charlotte; Twinkie Clark; Twinkie Clark; Verity
 "Holding On"; Amazing Love; Mississippi Mass Choir; Dorothy Love-Coates; Malaco
 "I Love To Praise Him"; Praise in His Presence Live; Marvin Sapp; Frederick L. Vaughn, Ralph Lofton, Paul Wright, Terry Baker, Simeon Baker, Charles Al Willis; Harborwood
 "People Get Ready"; Higher Ground; Blind Boys Of Alabama; Curtis Mayfield; EMI Gospel
 "Thank You"; Believe; Yolanda Adams; V. Michael McKay; Elektra
 "The Glory of the Blood"; Left Behind II-Tribulation Force Gospel; Dottie Peoples; Reggie Hamm, Jim Cooper; Gospel One

Contemporary Gospel Recorded Song of the Year
 "Brighter Day"; The Rebirth of Kirk Franklin; Kirk Franklin; Kirk Franklin; Gospocentric
 "For Love Alone"; CeCe Winans; CeCe Winans; CeCe Winans, Adam Anders, Pamela Sheyne; Wellspring Gospel
 "Hosanna"; The Rebirth of Kirk Franklin; Kirk Franklin; Kirk Franklin; Gospocentric
 "In The Morning"; Incredible; Mary Mary; Warryn Campbell, Tina Akins-Campbell, Erica Atkins-Campbell, J. Campbell; Integrity
 "The Best Is Yet To Come"; Go Get Your Life Back; Donald Lawrence & The Tri-City Singers; Donald Lawrence, Crystal Bernard; EMI Gospel

Rap/Hip Hop/Dance Album of the Year
 Beautiful; Brent Jones & the T.P. Mobb; Walter 'Lil Walt' Milsap Jr., Brian Peters, Brent Jones, Gorden Campbell, Asaph Ward, Gregg Curtis, Joe Wolfe, George Hambrick; EMI Gospel
 Collaborations; KJ-52; Todd Collins; Uprok
 Exodus; Andy Hunter; Tedd T., Andy Hunter; Sparrow
 Hindsight; John Reuben; Todd Collins, John Reuben; Gotee
 The Art Of Translation; GRITS; Teron Carter, Stacey Jones, Ric Robbins, Otto Price, Kenne Bell; Gotee

Modern Rock/Alternative Album of the Year
 Contact; The Benjamin Gate; Quinlan; ForeFront
 Divine Discontent; Sixpence None the Richer; Paul Fox, Matt Slocum; Reprise
 The Eleventh Hour; Jars of Clay; Dan Haseltine, Charlie Lowell, Stephen Mason, Matt Odmark; Essential
 The Way I Am; Jennifer Knapp; Tony McAnany; Gotee
 Welcome to the Rock 'N' Roll Worship Circus; The Rock 'N' Roll Worship Circus; Gabriel Wilson, Solo; Vertical

Hard Music Album of the Year
 Conceived in Fire; Living Sacrifice; Barry Poynter; Solid State
 Demon Hunter; Demon Hunter; Aaron Sprinkle; Solid State
 Fireproof; Pillar; Travis Wyrick; Flicker USA
 Parade Of Chaos; ZAO; Barry Poynter; Solid State
 Truthless Heroes; Project 86; Matt Hyde; Tooth & Nail

Rock Album of the Year
 12 Stones; 12 Stones; Jay Baumgardner, Dave Fortman; Wind Up
 Kutless; Kutless; Aaron Sprinkle; Tooth & Nail
 Lift; Audio Adrenaline; Mark Stuart, Will McGinnis, Ben Cissell, Tyler Burkum; ForeFront
 Truth, Soul, Rock & Roll; The Elms; Brent Milligan; Sparrow
 Turn The Tides; 38th Parallel; Tony McAnany; Squint

Pop/Contemporary Album of the Year
 By Surprise; Joy Williams; Brown Bannister; Reunion
 Myself When I Am Real; Bebo Norman; Ed Cash, Bebo Norman; Essential
 New Map of the World; Paul Colman Trio; Monroe Jones; Essential
 Spoken For; MercyMe; Peter Kipley; INO
 Woven & Spun; Nichole Nordeman; Charlie Peacock, Mark Hammond; Sparrow

Inspirational Album of the Year
 Be Glad; The Brooklyn Tabernacle Choir; Carol Cymbala; M2.0
 Legacy...Hymns & Faith; Amy Grant; Brown Bannister, Vince Gill; Word
 Ronnie Freeman; Ronnie Freeman; Bryan Lenox; Rocketown
 Storm; Fernando Ortega; John Andrew Schreiner; Word
 Woven in Time; Steve Green; Phil Naish; Sparrow

Southern Gospel Album of the Year
 A Crabb Collection; The Crabb Family; Mike Bowling; Family Music Group
 Gold City Camp Meetin'''; Gold City; Daniel Riley, Doug Riley; New Haven
 Live at First Baptist Atlanta; Greater Vision; Wayne Haun, Gerald Wolfe; Daywind
 Safe Thus Far; The Hoskins Family; Wayne Haun; Daywind
 Triumph; Karen Peck & New River; Michael Sykes, Phil Johnson; Spring Hill

Bluegrass Album of the Year
 50th Anniversary Celebration; Lewis Family; Wayne Haun, Buddy Spicher; Thoroughbred
 Climbing Up the Ladder; Principles; Rick Hendrix, Ronne Slagle; Hendrix Music
 Faraway Land; Ron Block; Ron Block; Rounder
 Oh Brother….What Now?; Chigger Hill Boys and Terri; Terri Argot, Justin Kropf, Mike Richards, Rodney Lay Jr., Ricky Gore; Mator'Lick
 Tribute To Gov. Jimmie Davis; The Village Singers; Sonny Osbourne; Pinecastle

Country Album of the Year
 An Inconvenient Christmas; The Oak Ridge Boys; Michael Sykes, Duane Allen; Spring Hill
 Everything Good; Gaither Vocal Band; Bill Gaither, Michael Sykes, Guy Penrod; Spring House
 How Sweet The Sound; The Charlie Daniels Band; Charlie Daniels, Patrick Kelly, David Corlew; Sparrow
 My, Oh My!; Jeff & Sheri Easter; Michael Sykes; Spring Hill
 Rise And Shine; Randy Travis; Kyle Lehning; Word

Urban Album of the Year
 Believe; Yolanda Adams; Jimmy Jam, Terry Lewis, James "Big Jam" Wright, Shep Crawford, Kevin Bond, Mike City, Warryn Campbell, Buster, Shavoni; Elektra
 Fault Is History; Souljahz; Tonex, Chris Rodriguez; Warner Brothers
 Incredible; Mary Mary; Warryn Campbell, Rodney Jerkins, Charlie Bereal, Kenny Bereal, Mike City; Integrity
 The Kiss; Trin-i-tee 5:7; Darren Henson, Shep Crawford, Carvin Higgins; Gospocentric/B-Rite
 This Is Your Life; Out of Eden; Lisa Kimmey, Donnie Scantz, Jaimie Portee, Nate Clemmons; Gotee

Traditional Gospel Album of the Year
 Churchin' With Dottie; Dottie Peoples; Dottie Peoples; Atlanta International
 Come Fly With Me; Luther Barnes; Luther Barnes; Atlanta International
 Higher Ground; Blind Boys of Alabama; John Chelew; Real World/EMI Gospel
 I Owe You The Praise; The Georgia Mass Choir; Rev. Milton Biggham; Savoy
 Nobody But You; Norman Hutchins; Professor James Roberson, Jason White; JDI
 Walking By Faith; The Canton Spirituals; Harvey Watkins, Jr., Cornelius Dwayne Watkins, Merlin Lucious; Verity

Contemporary Gospel Album of the Year
 Beautiful World; Take 6; Marcus Miller, Alvin Chea, Cedric Dent, Joel Kibble, Mark Kibble, Claude McKnight, David Thomas; Squint
 I Need You Now; Smokie Norful; Derek 'DOA' Allen, Smokie Norful, Edwin Oliver III, Antonio Dixon, Logan Reynolds; EMI Gospel
 Real; Israel; Tommy Sims, Danny Duncan; Integrity Gospel
 Speak Those Things: POL Chapter 3; Fred Hammond; Fred Hammond, Warryn Campbell; Verity
 The Rebirth of Kirk Franklin; Kirk Franklin; Sanchez Harley, Kirk Franklin; Gospocentric

Instrumental Album of the Year
 Did You Feel The Mountains Tremble; Rivertribe; Stuart Favilla, Dave Gleeson, Mike Lane; Elevate
 Hymnsongs; Phil Keaggy; Phil Keaggy, Ric Hordinski; Word
 In The Spirit; Kirk Whalum, Ben Tankard, Steven Ford, Abraham Laboriel; Joe Pace; Integrity Gospel
 Praise & Worship Instrumental; Mike Casteel, Eda Chako-Moore, Amy Cooper, Tracey Phillips, Robbie Shankle; Wayne Haun, Michelle Gayhart, Tracy Phillips; Daywind
 Resting Place: David Hamilton; David Hamilton; Word
 The Gospel According to Jazz (Chapter II); Kirk Whalum; Kirk Whalum, Tyrone Dickerson, Hal Sacks; Warner Brothers Jazz

Praise and Worship Album of the Year
 Blessed; Darlene Zschech; Hillsong Music/Integrity Music
 Lifestyle; The Katinas; Bryan Lenox, Sam Katina, John Katina, James Katina, Joe Katina, Jessie Katina; Gotee
 Not To Us; Chris Tomlin; Sam Gibson, Matt Bronleewe; sixstepsrecords
 Worship Again; Michael W. Smith; Michael W. Smith; Reunion
 Worship God; Rebecca St. James; Matt Bronleewe; ForeFront

Children's Music Album of the Year
 Club de la Aventura 2; Nathan Aanderud; Nathan Aanderud; Vida
 Jonah, A Veggie Tales Movie Original Soundtrack; Kurt Heinecke, Phil Vischer, Mike Nawrocki, David Mullen, Steve Taylor, Monroe Jones; Big Idea
 Meet Me at the Manger; Celeste Clydesdale, David T. Clydesdale; Clydesdale & Clydesdale
 Shout Praises! - Kid's Gospel; Israel Houghton; Integrity
 Toddler Bible Songs; Cedarmont Kids; Mike Gay, Sue Gay, Christopher Davis, Matt Huesmann; Cedarmont Kids

Spanish Language Album of the Year
 Alabanza y Adoracion en Vivo (Desde Espana); Marcos Vidal; Tom Brooks and Abraham Laboriel; Piedra Angular
 Me Inundas; Rodrigo Espinoza; Alvaro Lopez, Jose Garces; One Voice
 Navidad; Jaci Velasquez; Chris Harris for Fun Attic Prod., Alejandro Jean; Word
 Proclamare Tu Amor 2; Generaciones; Miguel Angel Villagran; Integrity
 Spanish Prayer Of Jabez; Susana Allen, Michael Rodriguez, Steve Reischl, Rene Gonzalez, Jamie Rowe, Jaime Murrell, Ruth Rios; John Hartley, David Zaffiro, Alex Allen, Arturo Allen; ForeFront
 Yo Ire; Steve Green; Phil Naish For NT Productions; Sparrow

Special Event Album of the Year
 All Star Hymns; Greater Vision, Gold City, Perrys, Brian Free & Assurance, Cumberland Quartet, Nelons, LordSong, Mike Bowling, Paynes, Southern Brothers, Hoskins Family, Ernie Haase, Old Time Gospel Hour Quartet; Wayne Haun, Norman Holland; Daywind
 City on a Hill-Sing Alleluia; Caedmon's Call, FFH, Jars of Clay, Jennifer Knapp, Phil Keaggy, Nichole Nordeman, Bebo Norman, Fernando Ortega, The Choir, Third Day; Steve Hindalong, Marc Byrd; Essential
 Girls Of Grace; Point of Grace, Nichole Nordeman, Christy Nockels, Out of Eden, Rachael Lampa, Jennifer Deibler, Jaci Velasquez, Jill Phillips, Joy Williams; Nathan Nockels; Word
 Passion - Our Love Is Loud; Charlie Hall, Chris Tomlin, David Crowder; Tom Laune, Louie Giglio, Shelley Giglio; sixstepsrecords
 Traveling Light; Joel Hanson, Sara Groves, Amy Grant, Bryan White, Jaci Velasquez, Mac Powell, Adore, Fleming & John, Russ Taff, Jenna Lucado, Michael Tait, Ellie Bannister, Derri Daugherty; Steve Hindalong, Brown Bannister; Creative Trust Workshop

Musical of the Year
 Agnus Dei; David Hamilton with Dennis, Karla Worley; Word Music
 Christmas Is Jesus; Mike Speck; Word Music
 God in Us; Don Moen, Tom Fettke, Randy Vader, Jack Hayford, Jay Rouse, Camp Kirkland; Integrity
 Land of the Free; Sue C. Smith, Russell Mauldin; Brentwood Music Publications
 The Christmas Shoes; Donna VanLiere, Eddie Carswell, J. Daniel Smith; Brentwood Music Publications

Youth/Children's Musical of the Year
 Christmas Time; Tony Wood, Scott Krippayne, Stephen Tedeschi, Craig Adams; Brentwood Music Publications
 Meet Me at the Manger; Celeste Clydesdale; Clydesdale & Clydesdale Music
 Stranger in the Manger; Sue C. Smith, Johnathan Crumpton; Brentwood Kids Music Club
 The Prayer Of Jabez; Karla Worley, Robert Sterling; Word Music
 The Tale of Three Trees; Dave Clark, Jayme Thompson; Brentwood Kids Music Club

Choral Collection of the Year
 Be Glad; Carol Cymbala; Brooklyn Tabernacle Music
 Christ Church Choir's Christmas Tapestry; Landy Gardner, Joy Gardner, Bradley Knight; Brentwood Music Publications
 More Songs For Praise & Worship 2; Ken Barker, Keith Christopher; Word Music
 Song of Praise; Geron Davis; Spirit Sound Music
 The WOW Collection; Steven V. Taylor, Johnathan Crumpton; Brentwood Music Publications

Recorded Music Packaging of the Year
 Cover Me; Brother's Keeper; Craig Thompson, David Terri; Craig Thompson, David Terri; Ben Pearson; Ardent
 Hero; Daily Planet; Stephanie McBrayer, Scott Hughes; Rusty Mitchell; Kristin Barlowe; Reunion
 Hi-Fi Revival; The O.C. Supertones; Don Clark; Don Clark; Ben Pearson; Tooth & Nail
 The Art and Craft of Popular Music; Joy Electric; Don Clark; Don Clark; Tim Owen, Brandon Ebel, Matt Wignall, David Johnson; BEC
 Unusual; All Together Separate; Craig Thompson, David Terri; Craig Thompson, David Terri; Dave Studarus, Gary Walpole; Ardent
 Welcome to the Rock 'N' Roll Worship Circus; The Rock 'N' Roll Worship; Sam Noerr; Matthew Lloyd; Karen Mason-Blair; Vertical

Short Form Music Video of the Year
 "Brighter Day"; Kirk Franklin; Keith Paschall; Billy Woodruff; Gospocentric
 "Existence"; Kevin Max; April Dace; Steven Weaver; ForeFront
 "Holla"; Trin-i-tee 5:7; Keith Paschall; Billy Woodruff; Gospocentric/B-Rite
 "Irene"; tobyMac; Alex Moon; Rick Kim; ForeFront
 "There She Stands"; Michael W. Smith; Rod Carpenter; Ken Carpenter; Reunion
 "Wait For Me"; Rebecca St. James; Tameron Hedge; Erick Welch; ForeFront

Long Form Music Video
 11 Live: Jars of Clay in Concert; Jars of Clay; Caryl Glotzer, Stephen Wallen; Manny Rodriquez; Essential
 All The Best...Live; Sandi Patty; David Imber, Bubba Smith; Monte Johnson; Word
 Momentum DVD; tobyMac; Scott McDaniel, Tameron Hedge, Eric Welch, Alex Moon; Eric Welch, Rich Kim; ForeFront
 Newsboys Thrive From the Rock and Roll Hall of Fame and Museum; Newsboys; Jerry Rose; Michael Drumm; Sparrow
 Worship''; Michael W. Smith; Michael W. Smith; Michael Sacci, Ken Conrad; Carl Diebold; Reunion

Nominees 2003
Dove Award Nominees, 2003